A list of American films released in 1941.

How Green Was My Valley won Best Picture at the Academy Awards.

A–B

C–D

E–H

I–N

O–S

T–Z

Documentaries

Serials

Shorts

See also
 1941 in the United States

References

External links

1941 films at the Internet Movie Database

1941
Films
Lists of 1941 films by country or language